N-formylmaleamate deformylase (NicD) is an enzyme with systematic name N-formylmaleamic acid amidohydrolase. This enzyme catalyses the following chemical reaction

 N-formylmaleamic acid + H2O  maleamate + formate

The reaction is involved in the aerobic catabolism of nicotinic acid.

References

External links 
 

EC 3.5.1